Sabrina Sobhy, (born December 30, 1996 in Long Island) is a professional squash player who represents the United States. She reached a career high world ranking of World No. 15 in November 2022.

Sobhy is class of 2019 at Harvard University having majored in psychology. She played #1 on the Harvard Crimson women's squash|varsity squash team for all 4 years. She was the co-captain of the team her senior year and led the team to an undefeated season. During her tenure on the Harvard Women's Varsity Squash Team, they won 4 Team National Titles all four years of her college career. Sabrina was also awarded the Ivy League Player of the Year Freshman and Senior years. 
In 2014, Sabrina made history as the youngest player to ever win both the U.S. Junior and Senior National Titles in the same year. Over an 8 year span, Sabrina has been selected to compete on both the U.S Junior and Women's National teams, experiencing international competition and helping the US Woman's National Team achieve their highest ranking to date. 
In July, 2019 Sabrina became a two time Gold Medalist at the Pan American games, in Lima Peru, in both the team and the doubles events. Sabrina was teamed up in the doubles with her sister, Amanda Sobhy, a top U.S. women's squash player Amanda Sobhy who also went to Harvard and is currently ranked 4 in the world as of April 2022. They have been referred to as "The William Sisters of Squash."

In 2022, she was part of the United States team that reached the final of the 2022 Women's World Team Squash Championships. It was the first time that the United States had reached the final.

See also 
 Official Women's Squash World Ranking

References

External links 

American female squash players
Harvard Crimson women's squash players
Living people
1996 births
People from Sea Cliff, New York
Squash players at the 2019 Pan American Games
Pan American Games medalists in squash
Pan American Games gold medalists for the United States
Medalists at the 2019 Pan American Games

American people of Egyptian descent